The Pakistan Army basketball team is the basketball team of the sports department of the Pakistan Army. Several of the team's players belong to the elite of Pakistan and have played for the Pakistan national basketball team.

Notable players

 Nawazish Ali Lora
 Pervaiz Hussain 
 Waheed Iqbal

References 

Sports teams in Pakistan
Basketball in Pakistan
Pakistan Army